Thandavapura  is a village in the southern state of Karnataka, India. It is located in the Nanjangud taluk of Mysore district in Karnataka.

Demographics
As of 2001 India census, Thandavapura had a population of 5156 with 2722 males and 2434 females.

Transportation
The village has its own railway station where only two slow trains stop.  Trains are available from Mysore at 4.50 am, 7.10 am, 8.50 am, 12.20pm, 2.40pm and 1.40pm.
The nearest major railway station is Mysore.  Buses are easily available to Nanjangud and Chamarajanagar towns.

Education
A government primary and high school are present in the village.
There is also an engineering college, 'Maharaja Institute of Technology Thandavapura (MITT)', located here.

Image gallery

See also
Kadakola
Sujatha Puram Halt
Nanjangud Town
Chinnada Gudi Hundi
yechaganahalli

References

External links

Villages in Mysore district